Capila lidderdali, also known as Lidderdale's dawnfly, is a species of hesperid butterfly found in India and Southeast Asia.

Range

The butterfly occurs in Nepal, Sikkim, Bhutan, Northeast India (Assam) and also in Laos.

The type locality is Darjeeling.

Status
It is very rare in Bhutan.

Cited references

See also
Pyrginae
Hesperiidae
List of butterflies of India (Pyrginae)
List of butterflies of India (Hesperiidae)

References
Print

Watson, E. Y. (1891) Hesperiidae indicae: being a reprint of descriptions of the Hesperiidae of India, Burma, and Ceylon.. Vest and Co. Madras.
Online

Brower, Andrew V. Z. (2007). Capila Moore 1866. Version 4 March 2007 (under construction). http://tolweb.org/Capila/95329/2007.03.04 in The Tree of Life Web Project, http://tolweb.org/

Capila
Butterflies of Asia
Butterflies of Indochina